Estadio Marcelo Tinoco is a multi-use stadium located in Danlí, Honduras.  It is currently used mostly for football matches and it's Lobos UPNFM home stadium.

History
The name of the stadium is a tribute to goalkeeper Marcelo Tinoco, who played in the 1960s and suffered several internal blows after a football match which led him to death.

References

Marcelo Tinoco